Chromohalobacter beijerinckii is a motile, rod-like, salt-loving, Gram-negative soil bacterium, 0.4–0.6 μm by 1.8–2.5 μm.

The bacterium was isolated in 1935 by T. Hof from fermented salted beans preserved in brine. Hof named it Pseudomonas beijerinckii and identified it as the organism responsible for the purple color of that food.  The pigment was the calcium salt of tetrahydroxy-p-benzoquinone Ca2C6O6, derived from the beans' myo-inositol. The bacterium thrives in media with salt (NaCl) concentrations ranging from 0.35% to 25%; the optimum growth occurs at 8 to 10% NaCl, pH 7.5, and 35 °C.

Reclassification
In 2006, comparison of the DNAs of P. beijerinckii'''s  DNA with that of other Chromohalobacter bacteria indicated that it definitely belonged to that genus, and in fact was virtually identical to a species of Chromohalobacter recently isolated from salted herring of the Baltic Sea.  Therefore the name was changed to Chromohalobacter beijerinckii.  It is very similar but distinct from the species Chromohalobacter japonicus'', isolated in 2007 from a Japanese salty food.

References

External links
Type strain of Chromohalobacter beijerinckii at BacDive -  the Bacterial Diversity Metadatabase

Oceanospirillales
Bacteria described in 1935